The Hastings by-election was a Parliamentary by-election held on 3 March 1908. The constituency returned one Member of Parliament (MP) to the House of Commons of the United Kingdom, elected by the first past the post voting system.

Vacancy
The seat had become vacant following the resignation of the sitting Unionist MP, Harvey Du Cros, on grounds of ill health. He had been the MP for the seat of Hastings since the 1906 general election.

Electoral history
The seat had been Conservative since they gained it in 1906 against the national swing, having surprisingly lost it to the Liberals in 1900.

Candidates

The Conservatives quickly adopted 37-year-old Arthur Du Cros, son of the former MP, as their new candidate. He had been born and raised in Dublin before entering the family rubber tyre manufacturing business in the Birmingham area. In 1906 Du Cros unsuccessfully contested the London seat of Bow & Bromley as a Conservative candidate.

The Liberals had no local candidate because their previous candidate Freeman Freeman-Thomas had since been elected at a by-election. There was a delay in selecting 30-year-old Robert Vernon Harcourt, the son of Sir William Harcourt as their man. Harcourt was educated at Eton College and Trinity College, Cambridge, where he took honours in the History Tripos. At Cambridge, he was a committee member of Cambridge University Liberal Club from 1899 to 1900. Harcourt went into the Foreign Service, serving as a clerk on the diplomatic establishment of the Foreign Office from 1900 to 1906. He was then briefly engaged in journalism, being parliamentary correspondent of the magazine Tribune. He stood unsuccessfully for the London County Council seat of Mile End in 1907, as a Progressive. He was standing for parliament for the first time.

Campaign
Polling Day was fixed for 3 March 1908. The themes raised in the by-election ranged over many issues of the day and the clash between what was seen as the local man (Du Cros) versus the government incomer (Harcourt), even though they were both outsiders to the area.

Harcourt promoted his candidacy as that of a strong supporter of free trade.

Members of the militant Women's Social and Political Union were in Hastings campaigning for the Conservative candidate, even though he was an opponent of women's suffrage, while the Liberal candidate was a supporter.

Result
The Conservatives held the seat and managed an increased majority;

Both the Sussex Express and The Times newspapers were agreed that the Unionist victory was "first and foremost [due] to Tariff Reform and particularly to the colonial preference side of the question".

Aftermath
Harcourt had to wait only a few more weeks to get into Parliament. He was adopted as Liberal candidate at a by-election at Montrose Burghs following the elevation to the peerage of the sitting member there, the veteran Liberal John Morley, was elected on 12 May 1908, and served as Member for Montrose until 1918.
Du Cros held Hastings at the subsequent General Election.

Du Cros held the seat until 1918 when he transferred to stand as a Coalition Conservative in Clapham, a seat he held until 1922.

References

 Craig, F. W. S. (1974). British Parliamentary Election Results 1885–1918 (1 ed.). London: Macmillan.
 Who's Who: www.ukwhoswho.com
 Debrett's House of Commons (1916)

By-elections to the Parliament of the United Kingdom in East Sussex constituencies
1908 elections in the United Kingdom
1908 in England
20th century in Sussex
Politics of Hastings